This page lists all described species of the spider family Stiphidiidae accepted by the World Spider Catalog :

A

Aorangia

Aorangia Forster & Wilton, 1973
 A. agama Forster & Wilton, 1973 — New Zealand
 A. ansa Forster & Wilton, 1973 (type) — New Zealand
 A. fiordensis Forster & Wilton, 1973 — New Zealand
 A. isolata Forster & Wilton, 1973 — New Zealand
 A. kapitiensis Forster & Wilton, 1973 — New Zealand
 A. mauii Forster & Wilton, 1973 — New Zealand
 A. muscicola Forster & Wilton, 1973 — New Zealand
 A. obscura Forster & Wilton, 1973 — New Zealand
 A. otira Forster & Wilton, 1973 — New Zealand
 A. pilgrimi Forster & Wilton, 1973 — New Zealand
 A. poppelwelli Forster & Wilton, 1973 — New Zealand
 A. pudica Forster & Wilton, 1973 — New Zealand
 A. semita Forster & Wilton, 1973 — New Zealand
 A. silvestris Forster & Wilton, 1973 — New Zealand
 A. singularis Forster & Wilton, 1973 — New Zealand
 A. tumida Forster & Wilton, 1973 — New Zealand

Asmea

Asmea Gray & Smith, 2008
 A. akrikensis Gray & Smith, 2008 (type) — New Guinea
 A. capella Gray & Smith, 2008 — New Guinea
 A. hayllari Gray & Smith, 2008 — New Guinea
 A. mullerensis Gray & Smith, 2008 — New Guinea

B

Borrala

Borrala Gray & Smith, 2004
 B. dorrigo Gray & Smith, 2004 (type) — Australia (New South Wales)
 B. longipalpis Gray & Smith, 2004 — Australia (New South Wales)
 B. webbi Gray & Smith, 2004 — Australia (New South Wales)
 B. yabbra Gray & Smith, 2004 — Australia (New South Wales)

C

Carbinea

Carbinea Davies, 1999
 C. breviscapa Davies, 1999 — Australia (Queensland)
 C. longiscapa Davies, 1999 (type) — Australia (Queensland)
 C. robertsi Davies, 1999 — Australia (Queensland)
 C. wunderlichi Davies, 1999 — Australia (Queensland)

Couranga

Couranga Gray & Smith, 2008
 C. diehappy Gray & Smith, 2008 — Australia (Queensland, New South Wales)
 C. kioloa Gray & Smith, 2008 (type) — Australia (Queensland, New South Wales)

E

Elleguna

Elleguna Gray & Smith, 2008
 E. major Gray & Smith, 2008 (type) — Australia (Queensland)
 E. minor Gray & Smith, 2008 — Australia (Queensland)

J

Jamberoo

Jamberoo Gray & Smith, 2008
 J. actensis Gray & Smith, 2008 — Australian Capital Territory
 J. australis Gray & Smith, 2008 — Australia (Victoria)
 J. boydensis Gray & Smith, 2008 — Australia (New South Wales)
 J. johnnoblei Gray & Smith, 2008 (type) — Australia (New South Wales)

K

Kababina

Kababina Davies, 1995
 K. alta Davies, 1995 (type) — Australia (Queensland)
 K. aquilonia Davies, 1995 — Australia (Queensland)
 K. colemani Davies, 1995 — Australia (Queensland)
 K. covacevichae Davies, 1995 — Australia (Queensland)
 K. formartine Davies, 1995 — Australia (Queensland)
 K. inferna Davies, 1995 — Australia (Queensland)
 K. isley Davies, 1995 — Australia (Queensland)
 K. superna Davies, 1995 — Australia (Queensland)
 K. yungaburra Davies, 1995 — Australia (Queensland)

Karriella

Karriella Gray & Smith, 2008
 K. treenensis Gray & Smith, 2008 (type) — Australia (Western Australia)
 K. walpolensis Gray & Smith, 2008 — Australia (Western Australia)

M

Malarina

Malarina Davies & Lambkin, 2000
 M. cardwell Davies & Lambkin, 2000 — Australia (Queensland)
 M. collina Davies & Lambkin, 2000 — Australia (Queensland)
 M. masseyensis Davies & Lambkin, 2000 — Australia (Queensland)
 M. monteithi Davies & Lambkin, 2000 (type) — Australia (Queensland)

Marplesia

Marplesia Lehtinen, 1967
 M. dugdalei Forster & Wilton, 1973 (type) — New Zealand
 M. pohara Forster & Wilton, 1973 — New Zealand

N

Neolana

Neolana Forster & Wilton, 1973
 N. dalmasi (Marples, 1959) (type) — New Zealand
 N. pallida Forster & Wilton, 1973 — New Zealand
 N. septentrionalis Forster & Wilton, 1973 — New Zealand

Neoramia

Neoramia Forster & Wilton, 1973
 N. allanae Forster & Wilton, 1973 — New Zealand
 N. alta Forster & Wilton, 1973 — New Zealand
 N. charybdis (Hogg, 1910) (type) — New Zealand
 N. childi Forster & Wilton, 1973 — New Zealand
 N. crucifera (Hogg, 1909) — New Zealand (Auckland Is.)
 N. finschi (L. Koch, 1872) — New Zealand
 N. fiordensis Forster & Wilton, 1973 — New Zealand
 N. hoggi (Forster, 1964) — New Zealand (Campbell Is.)
 N. hokina Forster & Wilton, 1973 — New Zealand
 N. janus (Bryant, 1935) — New Zealand
 N. koha Forster & Wilton, 1973 — New Zealand
 N. komata Forster & Wilton, 1973 — New Zealand
 N. mamoea Forster & Wilton, 1973 — New Zealand
 N. marama Forster & Wilton, 1973 — New Zealand
 N. margaretae Forster & Wilton, 1973 — New Zealand
 N. matua Forster & Wilton, 1973 — New Zealand
 N. minuta Forster & Wilton, 1973 — New Zealand
 N. nana Forster & Wilton, 1973 — New Zealand
 N. oroua Forster & Wilton, 1973 — New Zealand
 N. otagoa Forster & Wilton, 1973 — New Zealand
 N. raua Forster & Wilton, 1973 — New Zealand
 N. setosa (Bryant, 1935) — New Zealand

P

Pillara

Pillara Gray & Smith, 2004
 P. coolahensis Gray & Smith, 2004 — Australia (New South Wales)
 P. griswoldi Gray & Smith, 2004 — Australia (New South Wales)
 P. karuah Gray & Smith, 2004 (type) — Australia (New South Wales)
 P. macleayensis Gray & Smith, 2004 — Australia (New South Wales)

Procambridgea

Procambridgea Forster & Wilton, 1973
 P. carrai Davies, 2001 — Australia (New South Wales)
 P. cavernicola Forster & Wilton, 1973 — Australia (New South Wales)
 P. grayi Davies, 2001 — Australia (New South Wales). Introduced to New Zealand
 P. hilleri Davies, 2001 — Australia (Queensland)
 P. hunti Davies, 2001 — Australia (New South Wales)
 P. kioloa Davies, 2001 — Australia (New South Wales)
 P. lamington Davies, 2001 — Australia (Queensland)
 P. montana Davies, 2001 — Australia (Queensland, New South Wales)
 P. monteithi Davies, 2001 — Australia (New South Wales)
 P. otwayensis Davies, 2001 — Australia (Victoria)
 P. ourimbah Davies, 2001 — Australia (New South Wales)
 P. rainbowi Forster & Wilton, 1973 (type) — Australia (New South Wales)

S

Stiphidion

Stiphidion Simon, 1902
 S. adornatum Davies, 1988 — Australia (Queensland)
 S. diminutum Davies, 1988 — Australia (Queensland)
 S. facetum Simon, 1902 (type) — Australia. Introduced to New Zealand
 S. raveni Davies, 1988 — Australia (New South Wales)

T

Tartarus

Tartarus Gray, 1973
 T. mullamullangensis Gray, 1973 (type) — Australia (Western Australia)
 T. murdochensis Gray, 1992 — Australia (Western Australia)
 T. nurinensis Gray, 1992 — Australia (Western Australia)
 T. thampannensis Gray, 1992 — Australia (Western Australia)

Therlinya

Therlinya Gray & Smith, 2002
 T. angusta Gray & Smith, 2002 — Australia (Queensland)
 T. ballata Gray & Smith, 2002 — Australia (New South Wales)
 T. bellinger Gray & Smith, 2002 — Australia (New South Wales)
 T. foveolata Gray & Smith, 2002 — Australia (Victoria)
 T. horsemanae Gray & Smith, 2002 — Australia (Queensland)
 T. kiah Gray & Smith, 2002 (type) — Australia (New South Wales, Victoria)
 T. lambkinae Gray & Smith, 2002 — Australia (Queensland)
 T. monteithi Gray & Smith, 2002 — Australia (Queensland)
 T. nasuta Gray & Smith, 2002 — Australia (Queensland)
 T. vexillum Gray & Smith, 2002 — Australia (Queensland)
 T. wiangaree Gray & Smith, 2002 — Australia (Queensland, New South Wales)

Tjurunga

Tjurunga Lehtinen, 1967
 T. paroculus (Simon, 1903) (type) — Australia (Tasmania)

W

Wabua

Wabua Davies, 2000
 W. aberdeen Davies, 2000 — Australia (Queensland)
 W. cleveland Davies, 2000 — Australia (Queensland)
 W. crediton Davies, 2000 — Australia (Queensland)
 W. elliot Davies, 2000 — Australia (Queensland)
 W. eungella Davies, 2000 — Australia (Queensland)
 W. halifax Davies, 2000 — Australia (Queensland)
 W. hypipamee Davies, 2000 — Australia (Queensland)
 W. kirrama Davies, 2000 — Australia (Queensland)
 W. major Davies, 2000 (type) — Australia (Queensland)
 W. paluma Davies, 2000 — Australia (Queensland)
 W. seaview Davies, 2000 — Australia (Queensland)

References

Stiphidiidae